Transdev Blazefield is a bus group, which operates local and regional bus services across Greater Manchester, Lancashire, North Yorkshire and West Yorkshire, England. Formed in August 1991, the group has been a subsidiary of French-based operator Transdev since January 2006.

History
Blazefield Travel was formed in August 1991, following the sale of AJS Group, owned by former East Yorkshire Motor Services managing director, Alan Stephenson. The company was sold in a management buyout to former directors, Giles Fearnley and Stuart Wilde – a deal valued at £2.2 million. The sale included seven of the company's eight remaining bus firms at the time, as well as 300 vehicles and 12 depots. Initially, there were seven operating subsidiaries: Keighley & District, Harrogate & District, Harrogate Independent Travel, Sovereign Bus & Coach, Sovereign Harrow and Welwyn Hatfield Line.

In September 1987, AJS Group purchased West Yorkshire Road Car Company from the National Bus Company. In April 1988, London Country North East was sold by the National Bus Company, the last of 72 subsidiaries to be privatised. Prior to the sale, the company was split in two, with County Bus & Coach and Sovereign Bus & Coach.

In August 1989, operations in Bradford and Leeds were transferred to Yorkshire Rider. The remaining operations were subsequently split into smaller companies: Keighley & District, Harrogate & District and York City & District. In July 1990, operation of local bus services in York were also transferred to Yorkshire Rider.

Cambridge Coach Services was an operator of coach services, day tours, short breaks and charters. The company began operations on 20 May 1990, following the sale of Premier Travel Services to Cambus Holdings. Cambridge Coach Services was operated by Blazefield Holdings between August and November 1991.

Following sale to the Blazefield Group, expansion soon followed, with the purchase of Cambridge Coach Services in November 1991, along with 14 vehicles and Watford-based Lucketts Travel. Ingfield of Settle was purchased in April 1992, and was merged with Keighley-based Northern Rose to form Ingfield–Northern Rose.

In 1986, Harrogate Independent Travel was set up by a number of West Yorkshire Road Car Company drivers, in a bid to challenge their former employer. The company was subsequently purchased by AJS Group in April 1989, before being merged with Harrogate & District in 1993. Harrogate & District further expanded in October 1996, following the transfer of bus operations in Ripon from Cowie Group.

In 1994, Blazefield purchased Borehamwood Travel Services, along with 43 vehicles – 22 of which were AEC Routemasters. The company was later renamed London Sovereign. In the same year, Ingfield–Northern Rose purchased Whaites Coaches of Settle. By this time, the group owned around 380 vehicles.

In 1998, Huntingdon & District was created with the operations of Premier Buses, owned by Julian Peddle. It was sold to Cavalier of Sutton Bridge in 2004.

In April 2001, Stagecoach sold their operations in Blackburn, Bolton and Clitheroe to the Blazefield Group, which rebranded them as Burnley & Pendle and Lancashire United. The sale was valued at £13 million. In August 2002, the depot in Bolton was sold to Blue Bus and Coach Services.

Over the next three years, Blazefield gradually withdrew from its operations in the south of England. In 2002, London Sovereign was sold to Transdev S.A., with Huntingdon & District sold to Cavalier Travel the following year. In 2004, operations in St Albans were sold to Centrebus. In early 2005, the Competition Commission cleared Blazefield's deal to sell what was left of London Sovereign to Arriva Shires & Essex.

In January 2006, French-based operator Transdev acquired the Blazefield Group, along with 305 vehicles.

In August 2006, Blackburn with Darwen Borough Council announced that after 125 years of municipal ownership, Blackburn Transport had been sold to Transdev Blazefield. The sale was finalised in January 2007. Eight months later, Accrington Transport and Northern Blue were acquired, along with the transfer of staff and 65 vehicles.

In August 2008, Top Line Travel and Veolia Transport were purchased. The company further expanded in February 2012, following the purchase of York Pullman's local bus operations. The sale included the transfer of 31 staff and 17 vehicles.

Following the granting of approval on 20 December 2017, Rossendale Transport Limited was sold by Rossendale Borough Council on 12 January 2018. The sale saw the company's 240 staff and 102 vehicles join Transdev Blazefield – a move which saw the investment of £3 million in a new fleet of high-specification vehicles for routes in and around Bury, Rochdale and Rossendale.

In April 2021, Transdev agreed terms with Arriva to purchase the Yorkshire Tiger operation in West Yorkshire. The sale was completed in July 2021, following which the operation was rebranded Team Pennine, with a two-tone pink livery introduced.

Fleet and operations
As of April 2022, Transdev Blazefield has seven operating subsidiaries: The Blackburn Bus Company, The Burnley Bus Company, The Harrogate Bus Company, The Keighley Bus Company, Rosso, Team Pennine and Yorkshire Coastliner. The company operates a total of 500 vehicles from ten depots across Yorkshire and the North West of England.

Notes

References

External links

Transdev Blazefield Limited on Companies House
Transdev Blazefield website

Bus operators in Lancashire
Bus operators in North Yorkshire
Bus operators in West Yorkshire
Companies based in Harrogate
Transdev
Transport companies established in 1991
Transport in Yorkshire
1991 establishments in England